Spiralisigna acidna is a moth in the family Geometridae. It is found in Australia and the south-western Pacific, including Fiji.

The larvae feed on the flowers of Myrtus and Acacia species.

References

Moths described in 1904
Eupitheciini